Psychic Chasms is the debut studio album by American electronic music band Neon Indian, released on October 13, 2009, by Lefse Records. Pitchfork placed the album at number 14 on its list of Top 50 Albums of 2009, while Rhapsody ranked it at number 17 on its list of 25 Best Albums of 2009.

A special edition of the album, titled Mind Ctrl: Psychic Chasms Possessed, was released digitally on August 31, 2010, and physically on September 28 by Fader Label, including a set of nine bonus remixes. In the United Kingdom, the special edition was released on September 28, 2010, by Static Tongues and added the track "Sleep Paralysist", while omitting two remixes.

Track listing

Sample credits
 "Deadbeat Summer" contains a sample of "Izzat Love?" by Todd Rundgren.
 "Local Joke" contains a sample of "How About a Little Fanfare?" by Todd Rundgren.

Personnel
Credits adapted from the liner notes of Psychic Chasms.

 Alan Palomo – recording, production
 Ronald Gierhart – guitar on "Terminally Chill" and "Ephemeral Artery"

Charts

References

2009 debut albums
Neon Indian albums